The Nepalese records in swimming are the fastest ever performances of swimmers from Nepal, which are recognised and ratified by the Nepal Swimming Association (NSA).

All records were set in finals unless noted otherwise.

Long Course (50 m)

Men

Women

Short Course (25 m)

Men

Women

Notes

References
General
Nepalese Swimming Records 31 July 2022 updated
Specific

External links
NSA official website

Nepal
Records
Swimming
Swimming